Diocese of Ballarat, located in Victoria (Australia), may refer to:

Anglican Diocese of Ballarat
Roman Catholic Diocese of Ballarat